The following radio stations broadcast on AM frequency 1332 kHz:

Australia 

 3SH in Swan Hill
 4BU in Bundaberg

Iran
 Radio Tehran in Tehran

United Kingdom
Premier Christian Radio at London

References

Lists of radio stations by frequency